The 1954–55 Copa México was the 39th edition of the Copa México and the 12th staging in the professional era.

The competition started on February 5, 1955, and concluded on March 6, 1955, with the Final, held at the Estadio Olímpico de la Ciudad de los Deportes in Mexico City, in which América defeated Guadalajara 1–0.

Preliminary round

|}

Final round

Final

References

Copa MX
Cop